Units Podem Més was an electoral coalition formed by Podemos, United Left of the Balearic Islands and Més per Mallorca in May 2016 to contest the 2016 Spanish general election in the Balearic Islands.

Composition

Electoral performance

Cortes Generales

References

2016 establishments in the Balearic Islands
Defunct political party alliances in Spain
Political parties established in 2016
Political parties in the Balearic Islands
Podemos (Spanish political party)
United Left (Spain)